Riverfront Park may refer to:
 Newark Riverfront Park, a park in Newark, New Jersey
 Riverfront Park (Salem, Oregon)
 Riverfront Park (Harrisburg), a park in Harrisburg, Pennsylvania
 Allegheny Riverfront Park, a park in Pittsburgh, Pennsylvania
 North Shore Riverfront Park, a park in Pittsburgh, Pennsylvania
 Riverfront Park (Spokane, Washington)

See also
 Riverfront Stadium
 Riverside Amusement Park (disambiguation)
 Riverside Park (disambiguation)